Rachel Ann Mills is a Professor of Ocean Chemistry at the University of Southampton. She is a deep-sea oceanographer who works on the chemistry of the seafloor and its impact on life in the sea.  She has led research expeditions using submersibles and remotely operated vehicles to remote and deep, unexplored parts of the ocean.

Early life and education 
Mills studied oceanography at the University of Southampton, graduating in 1988. She earned her PhD at the University of Cambridge. She was a member of the first cohort of graduate students to complete PhDs in oceanography at Cambridge.

Research and career 
Mills remained as a postdoctoral researcher at the University of Cambridge. She was appointed as a lecturer at the University of Southampton in 1993.

Mills works with biologists and microbiologists to understand how microbial and macrobiotic communities interact with seafloor mineral deposits. She used hydrothermal sediment geochemistry to understand past changes to Pacific Ocean ventilation during the Pleistocene. To evaluate carbon sequestration in the Southern Ocean, Mills uses sedimentary proxies of carbon cycling in the water column.

She is past-President of the Challenger Society for Marine Science, the UK’s learned society for oceanographers and other marine experts, which incorporates the UK Scientific Committee on Oceanic Research.  Mills is the lead educator for a massive open online course with FutureLearn "Exploring Our Ocean" that has had global reach with learners of all ages and impact on societal understanding of sustainable oceans. In 2016, she was appointed Dean of the Faculty of Natural and Environmental Sciences (now Faculty of Environmental and Life Sciences) at the University of Southampton. In 2017 the University of Southampton was awarded a royal warrant to establish a Regius Professorship in Ocean Sciences. She was previously Head of Ocean and Earth Science at the National Oceanography Centre, Southampton. She was a founding member of the Natural Environment Research Council Training Advisory Board. She is part of the international collaborative research project GEOTRACES.

In 2018 she appeared on BBC Radio 4's The Life Scientific.

References 

Living people
British geochemists
Women geochemists
20th-century British chemists
20th-century British women scientists
21st-century British chemists
21st-century British women scientists
Alumni of the University of Southampton
Alumni of the University of Cambridge
Academics of the University of Southampton
Year of birth missing (living people)